Roland William James (4 May 1897 – June 1979), sometimes known as Roly James, was an English professional footballer who played as an inside forward and right half in the Football League for Stockport County, Brentford and West Bromwich Albion.

Career statistics

References

1897 births
Sportspeople from Smethwick
English footballers
English Football League players
Association football wing halves
Brentford F.C. players
Association football inside forwards
West Bromwich Albion F.C. players
Stockport County F.C. players
1979 deaths
Manchester Central F.C. players
Stalybridge Celtic F.C. players